First Church of Christ, Scientist, Richmond, is a church on Sheen Road, Richmond, London. It is a branch of The First Church of Christ, Scientist in Boston, Massachusetts, founded in 1879.

Architecture
It was built between 1939 and 1953; the architects were W. Braxton Sinclair (who also designed the Grade II listed First Church of Christ Scientist in Bromley) and Barton. Bridget Cherry and Nikolaus Pevsner describe it as having "heavily modelled red brickwork, with some free Baroque details".

Services and activities
On Sunday mornings there is a church service and also a Sunday school for people under 20. A weekly testimony meeting is held on Wednesdays evenings.

The building includes a reading room.

The church is registered (number 81398) as a place of worship in accordance with the Places of Worship Registration Act 1855.

See also
 Cadogan Hall, the former First Church of Christ, Scientist, London
 First Church of Christ, Scientist (Brighton)
 former First Church of Christ, Scientist, Fallowfield, Manchester

References

External links 
 

1939 establishments in England
Christian Science churches in England
Churches in the London Borough of Richmond upon Thames
Richmond, London